Theodore Richards may refer to:
 Theodore William Richards, American chemist
 Theodore Richards (convict), convict transported to Western Australia